Beglitched is a 2016 match three video game. It won Best Student Game at the 2016 Independent Games Festival Awards.

Gameplay 

Beglitched is a match three game with themes of hacking, computer viruses, and spam.

Development 

Jenny Jiao Hsia and Alec Thompson developed Beglitched within the NYU Game Center's incubator. The game released for macOS and Windows in October 2016. An iOS release followed in March 2017.

Reception 

Beglitched won the Best Student Game category at the 2016 Independent Games Festival Awards.

See also 

 Fortune-499

References

Further reading 

 
 
 
 
 

2016 video games
Hacking video games
IOS games
Linux games
MacOS games
Tile-matching video games
Video games developed in the United States
Windows games

Independent Games Festival winners